"Rumors" is a song by American actress and singer Lindsay Lohan from her debut studio album Speak (2004). Originally titled "Just What It Is", the song was written and produced by Cory Rooney, while additional writing was done by Lohan, Taryll Jackson and T. J. Jackson. It was released as Lohan's debut single and lead single from Speak on September 27, 2004, by Casablanca Records. The song's lyrics allude to the constant paparazzi and media backlash regarding Lohan. Music critics reviews were mixed; with statements like "infectious" or "unnecessary".

"Rumors" achieved moderate commercial success worldwide, reaching top 30 positions in Australia, Austria, Germany and Switzerland. In the United States, the single peaked at number six on the Billboard Bubbling Under Hot 100 Singles chart, but was certified Gold by the Recording Industry Association of America (RIAA) for shipping over 500,000 units.

The accompanying music video for "Rumors" was directed by British director Jake Nava and featured Lohan attending a nightclub, playing around with the paparazzi. The video was nominated for Best Pop Video at the 2005 MTV Video Music Awards and reached the top position on MTV's Total Request Live. In 2014, Billboard ranked the song in its "Top 50 Forgotten Gems from the Now! series", which list songs from the series that were underrated at the time of their release.

Background and composition

"Rumors" was originally titled "Just What It Is". The song was written by Cory Rooney, Lohan, Taryll Jackson and T. J. Jackson. It was also produced by Rooney, who provided keyboards and background vocals. Peter Wade Keusch assisted the production, and was responsible along with Chris Avedon for Lohan's vocal recording, which occurred at the Poolhouse West and The Village in Los Angeles. Audio mixing was done by Keusch at Sony Music Studios in New York City. Christopher J. Warner provided the guitar present in the song's composition. "Rumors" is in the style of R&B. Lyrically, the song was written as a response to the paparazzi and media's backlash, both which are addressed in the chorus lines, where Lohan sings, "I'm tired of rumors starting/ I'm sick of being followed/ I'm tired of people lying/ Saying what they want about me/ Why can't they back up off me?/ Why can't they let me live?/ I'm going to do it my way/ Take this for just what it is." Spence D. of IGN noted that Lohan's vocals are "driven by snarls, breathy croons, and emotionally restrained angst", while John Murphy of musicOMH considered it "a feisty dance anthem with intelligent lyrics attacking the paparazzi and press in general".

Critical reception
"Rumors" received generally mixed reviews from music critics, however, it has become one of Lohan's most recognized songs and has now been labeled as "cult pop treasure". Charles Merwin of Stylus Magazine thought that "Rumors" was not a good choice for a single, stating, "in fact, for a girl, that has been tagged as America’s next sweetheart by some media outlets, it might be the worst choice of subject matter for the opening statement from a girl that automatically has more to prove to audiences because of her stature as an actress. Unfortunately, 'Rumors' is about as good as it gets." Erik Missio of ChartAttack thought that the song "presented potential for a semi-palatable debut effort", but further added that it is a "crap of a spectularly unspectacular level." Entertainment Weekly contributor Nicholas Fonseca, however, considered "Rumors" a guilty pleasure, while Stephen Thomas Erlewine of Allmusic selected the song a Track Pick in the review of Speak. IGN's Spence D. described it as "pervasively infectious, the kind of track that will no doubt keep the dance floors sweaty and steamy for a few months to come." John Murphy of musicOMH praised "Rumors" as a departure from Speaks soft rock genre.

Chart performance
"Rumors" achieved moderate commercial success worldwide. In the United States, the single peaked at number six on Billboards Bubbling Under Hot 100 Singles chart and reached number 23 on the Mainstream Top 40 component chart. However, it was certified Gold by the Recording Industry Association of America (RIAA) in February 2005. In Australia, "Rumors" debuted at number 19 on the ARIA charts, peaking at number 10 six weeks later, while being certified Gold by the Australian Recording Industry Association (ARIA). The single also attained top 30 positions in Austria and Switzerland, and reached the top 40 in the Netherlands and Sweden. In Germany, "Rumors" debuted and peaked at number 14.

Music video
Casablanca Records commissioned a music video to be directed by British director Jake Nava, who previously worked in the same year with Britney Spears on her music video for "My Prerogative", between September 11 and the early hours of September 13, 2004. The music video for "Rumors" premiered on October 14, 2004, and October 20, 2004, through Disney Channel and MTV.

Synopsis
In the beginning of the video, Lohan is followed by paparazzi as she is entering her car. It is revealed that this is a Lindsay-look-alike and that the real Lindsay is entering another car to go to a club. The car comes to a stop, and she then steps into an elevator and sings the first verse of the song, while she is filmed by a CCTV camera in the elevator. The next sequence shows her running through a hallway, dressed up, before getting into the club. There, she dances in the crowd, where she takes a picture of one of the paparazzi herself to get back at him. In the next sequence, she is walking slowly through the club where she finds the man who seems to be her boyfriend. She takes a seat next to her lover and they begin kissing and touching each other, all the while being constantly filmed by cameras in the club. While Lohan sings the second chorus, she is trapped in a cage in the middle of the club and the whole crowd is watching her. After this, Lohan is shown dancing in the club with her friends. At the end of the music video, Lohan and her friends enter the top of a high-rise and perform a dance routine while helicopters are circling around them. Finally, Lohan gets into a helicopter and escapes. In the end, she throws her camera away with all the pictures taken of her.

Reception
The music video for "Rumors" received very positive reviews from critics and viewers which eventually led to the video reaching the top position on the countdown of Total Request Live on the week of October 27, 2004, and was nominated on the category Best Pop Video during the 2005 MTV Video Music Awards.

Live performances
Lohan performed "Rumors" on Good Morning America in December 2004. According to a MTV News staff report, "Lohan missed the cue to mouth along, forcing cameras to cut away when her mouth remained closed as she was heard singing, thanks to a backing track." A representative for Lohan, however, revealed that Lohan actually sang it live, and noted that Lohan only used a background track "to help make the song sound like it does on her album." On December 31, 2004, Lohan performed "Rumors" at MTV's Iced Out New Year's Eve 2005.

Legacy
Despite having only achieved moderate commercial success, "Rumors" has since become Lohan's most recognized song of her career and has received significant attention in the years following its release. In 2020, Billboard ranked the song as Lohan's best song of her career, noting that the defiant lyric, “I'm gonna do it my way / Take this for just what it is,” would "ultimately turn into Lohan’s mantra for years to come". "Rumors" was also used during the opening of the 2020 Balmain Spring Fashion Show, in which Paper magazine noted that the song was finally getting recognition. In January 2021, the song received significant social media attention after being used on the season 13 premiere of RuPaul's Drag Race in a lip sync for your life between contestants Gottmik and Utica Queen, resulting in Lohan's name becoming a trending topic on Twitter.

Track listing and formats

 CD single
 "Rumors" – 3:16
 "Rumors" (Full Phatt Remix) – 3:25

 CD maxi-single
 "Rumors" – 3:16
 "Rumors" (Full Phatt Remix) – 3:25
 "Rumors" (Full Phatt Club Mix) – 3:49
 "Rumors" (video) – 3:25

 Digital EP
 "Rumors" – 3:16
 "Rumors" (Full Phatt Remix) – 3:25
 "Rumors" (Full Phatt Club Mix) – 3:50

Credits and personnel
Credits are taken from Speak liner notes.

Recording
 Recorded at Poolhouse West and The Village at Los Angeles, California.
 Mixed at Sony Music Studios in New York City, New York.

Personnel
 Songwriting: Cory Rooney, Lindsay Lohan, Taryll Jackson, T. J. Jackson
 Production: Cory Rooney, Peter Wade Keusch
 Recording: Peter Wade Keusch, Chris Avedon
 Mixing: Peter Wade Keusch
 Keyboards: Cory Rooney
 Guitar: Christopher J. Warner
 Background vocals: Lindsay Lohan, Cory Rooney

Charts

Weekly charts

Year-end charts

Certifications

Release history

References

2004 debut singles
Lindsay Lohan songs
Music videos directed by Jake Nava
Songs written by Cory Rooney
Songs written by Lindsay Lohan
Song recordings produced by Cory Rooney
2004 songs
Songs about the media
Song recordings produced by Peter Wade Keusch